Maizania is a genus of gastropods belonging to the family Maizaniidae.

The species of this genus are found in Africa.

Species:

Maizania angolensis 
Maizania chondrocycloides 
Maizania depressa 
Maizania elatior 
Maizania furadana 
Maizania hildebrandti 
Maizania kazibae 
Maizania lugubrioides 
Maizania magilensis 
Maizania marsabitensis 
Maizania miocenica 
Maizania natalensis 
Maizania olivacea 
Maizania pocsi 
Maizania scalarioidea 
Maizania subdepressa 
Maizania volkensi 
Maizania wahlbergi 
Maizania zanzibarica

References

Gastropods